Wesley French (born November 30, 1996) is an American football center for the Indianapolis Colts of the National Football League (NFL).

Professional career

On April 30, 2022, French signed with the Indianapolis Colts as an undrafted free agent, following the 2022 NFL Draft. He made the Colts' 53-man final roster out of training camp.

References

External links
Indianapolis Colts bio
Western Michigan Broncos bio

Indianapolis Colts players
1996 births
Living people
American football centers
Western Michigan Broncos football players
People from Benton Harbor, Michigan
Players of American football from Michigan